Neville Hewitt (born April 6, 1993) is an American football inside linebacker for the Houston Texans of the National Football League (NFL). He played college football at Marshall, where he was a safety and linebacker. Hewitt signed with the Miami Dolphins as an undrafted free agent in 2015.

College career
Hewitt spent the first 2 years of  his college football career at the junior college level, playing for Georgia Military College. In 2012, he recorded 65 tackles, five tackles for loss and five pass breakups for Georgia Military.

He then transferred to Marshall where he spent 2 years playing for the Herd. While at Marshall, he posted 208 tackles, including 16.5 for loss and 7.5 sacks, with two interceptions, four pass breakups, two fumble recoveries and one forced fumble. He was named  C-USA Defensive Player of the Year in 2014.

Professional career

Miami Dolphins

2015
On May 2, 2015, Hewitt signed with the Miami Dolphins as an undrafted free agent following the conclusion of the 2015 NFL Draft. He made his NFL debut on September 13, 2015, against the Washington Redskins. On November 22, he made first career start against the Dallas Cowboys and posted his first career interception. On January 3, 2016, Hewitt made a season-high six tackles one pass breakup against the New England Patriots. He finished his rookie season with 39 tackles and an interception.

2016
On December 4, 2016, Hewitt recorded his first-career fumble recovery against the Baltimore Ravens. On December 17, he made his first-career sack against the New York Jets. A week later, Hewitt recorded a career-high nine tackles against the Buffalo Bills. He made five tackles in the AFC wild card game against the Pittsburgh Steelers.

2017
On September 2, 2017, Hewitt was waived by the Dolphins. On October 9, 2017, he was re-signed to the Dolphins' practice squad. He was promoted to the active roster on November 22, 2017.

New York Jets

2018
On March 28, 2018, Hewitt signed one-year contract with the New York Jets. He played in 16 games with four starts, recording 39 combined tackles and 1.5 sacks.

2019

On March 13, 2019, Hewitt re-signed with the Jets.
In week 1 against the Buffalo Bills, Hewitt intercepted Josh Allen once as the Jets lost 17–16.
In week 2 against the Cleveland Browns. Hewitt recorded 8 tackles and sacked Baker Mayfield once in the 23–3 loss.
In week 11 against the Washington Redskins, Hewitt intercepted a pass thrown by Dwayne Haskins in the 34–17 win.

2020
On March 25, 2020, Hewitt re-signed with the Jets. He started all 16 games in 2020, leading the team with a career-high 134 tackles, along with 2.0 sacks, four passes defensed, and one interception.

Houston Texans
Hewitt signed with the Houston Texans on May 7, 2021. He played in all 17 games with five starts, recording 60 tackles.

On March 30, 2022, Hewitt re-signed with the Texans.

References

External links
Marshall bio
Miami Dolphins bio

1993 births
Living people
People from Milledgeville, Georgia
Players of American football from Georgia (U.S. state)
American football linebackers
Marshall Thundering Herd football players
Miami Dolphins players
New York Jets players
Houston Texans players